Otis Hudson (born July 19, 1986) is a former American football guard. He was drafted by the Cincinnati Bengals in the 5th round of the 2010 NFL Draft. He played college football at Eastern Illinois.

Early years
Otis was born and raised in the city of Chicago. He used sports as a way to stay out of trouble. He liked playing basketball, football, and baseball. When Hudson was in middle school, he became part of AAU basketball, which was coached by Douglas Keys. He started playing football in 8th grade and realized he had great athletic ability in football. He played on both the varsity offensive line and defensive line, when he was a freshman at John Marshall High School. He also played on the varsity basketball team as the center. When he was a sophomore in high school, he told his parents he wanted to move to the suburbs, because he knew he would have a better opportunity of playing NCAA football. Otis and his family moved to Barrington, IL. He played varsity football and basketball at Barrington High School and graduated in 2005.

He graduated from Eastern Illinois University and helped his team earn All Conference and All Area recognitions.  After graduation, he traveled to California to train with Travelle Gaines of Performance Gaines. Gaines always spoke highly of Hudson. "For the 2010 NFL draft, I have been training 24 top prospects, including Otis, and Otis is just as good as everyone I've seen. He has a work ethic that outclasses most and is very cooperative and coachable, which are intangibles you can't teach."

Professional career

Cincinnati Bengals
On July 7, 2010, Hudson agreed to terms on his rookie contract with the Cincinnati Bengals. He was penciled in as the backup right guard. On September 4, 2010, he was waived by the Bengals. He cleared waivers and was re-signed to the Bengals' practice squad.

During the 2011 season, Hudson spent part of the season on the active roster and on the practice squad. Coach Paul Alexander said he was one of the most improved players during summer camp in 2011.

Hudson spent the entire 2012 season on the Bengals' practice squad. On August 10, 2013, after an ankle injury caused Bengals rookie Tanner Hawkinson to be sidelined indefinitely, the Bengals re-signed Hudson. Hudson was later released during final roster cuts.

Kansas City Chiefs
Hudson signed with the Kansas City Chiefs on May 1, 2014. He was released August 25.

Personal life
As of 2021, Otis works at Merrill Lynch as a financial advisor.

References

External links
 Cincinnati Bengals bio
 Eastern Illinois Panthers bio

1986 births
Living people
American football offensive guards
American football offensive tackles
Cincinnati Bengals players
Eastern Illinois Panthers football players
Kansas City Chiefs players
People from Barrington, Illinois
Players of American football from Illinois
Sportspeople from Cook County, Illinois